Honswijk may refer to:

Places in the Netherlands:
 Honswijk, North Brabant, a former village in the Dutch municipality of Altena
 Honswijk, Utrecht, a hamlet in the Utrecht municipality of Houten